Tilletia walkeri is a species of fungus in the Tilletiaceae family. It causes the disease Ryegrass bunt, which affects ryegrass. The fungus is related to those causing Karnal bunt in wheat. The species was described in 1999.

References 

Fungi described in 1999
Ustilaginomycotina
Fungal plant pathogens and diseases
Monocot diseases